This is a list of lieutenant generals in the Swedish Navy, i.e. the Swedish Coastal Artillery (1902–2000) and in the Swedish Amphibious Corps (2000–present). The grade of lieutenant general (or three-star general) is ordinarily the second-highest in the peacetime Coastal Artillery/Amphibious Corps, ranking above major general and below general.

List of lieutenant generals
Entries are indexed by the numerical order in which each officer was appointed to that rank while on active duty, or by an asterisk (*) if the officer did not serve in that rank while on active duty. Each entry lists the officer's name, date of rank, date the officer vacated the active-duty rank, number of years on active duty as lieutenant general (Yrs), positions held as lieutenant general, and other biographical notes.

List of Swedish Coastal Artillery lieutenant generals (1902–2000)

List of Swedish Amphibious Corps lieutenant generals (2000–present)

See also
Generallöjtnant
List of Swedish Air Force lieutenant generals
List of Swedish Army lieutenant generals after 1900

Footnotes

References

Notes

Print

Lists of Swedish military personnel
Swedish Navy